Innokenty Gizel (c. 1600 - 18 November 1683) was a Prussian-born historian, writer, and political and ecclesiastic figure, who had adopted Orthodox Christianity and made a substantial contribution to Ukrainian culture.

Innokentiy Gizel was a rector of the Kyivan Theological School. In 1656, he was appointed archmandrite of the Kyiv Pechersk Lavra. Innokentiy Gizel is known to have supported the unification of Ukraine and autonomy of the Kyiv clergy, simultaneously. Innokentiy Gizel is generally credited for writing the Synopsis in 1674, but some researchers deny his authorship.

References

External links
 Иннокентий (Гизель) // Русский биографический словарь А. А. Половцова/ — СПб., 1897.
 Иннокентий (Гизель) // Православная энциклопедия. — М. : Церковно-научный центр «Православная энциклопедия», 2009. — Т. XXII. — 752 с. — 39 000 экз. — .

Ducal Prussian people
National University of Kyiv-Mohyla Academy alumni
Academic staff of the National University of Kyiv-Mohyla Academy
National University of Kyiv-Mohyla Academy presidents
Converts to Eastern Orthodoxy from Protestantism
Year of birth unknown
Year of birth uncertain
Ukrainian philosophers
Monks of Kyiv Pechersk Lavra
Archimandrites
1600 births
1683 deaths